Baltic German nobility was a privileged social class in the territories of today's Estonia and Latvia. It existed continuously since the Northern Crusades and the medieval foundation of Terra Mariana. Most of the nobility were Baltic Germans, but with the changing political landscape over the centuries, Polish, Swedish and Russian families also became part of the nobility, just as Baltic German families re-settled in locations such as the Swedish and Russian Empires. The nobility of Lithuania is for historical, social and ethnic reasons separated from the German-dominated nobility of Estonia and Latvia.

History

This nobility was a source of officers and other servants to Swedish kings in the 16th and particularly 17th centuries, when Couronian, Estonian, Livonian and the Oeselian lands belonged to them. Subsequently Russian Tsars used Baltic nobles in all parts of local and national government.

Latvia in particular was noted for its followers of Bolshevism and the latter were bitterly engaged throughout 1919 in a war against the aristocracy and Landed Estates and the German Freikorps. With independence the government was firmly Left. In 1918 in Estonia 90% of the large landed estates had been owned by Baltic Barons and Germans and about 58% of all agricultural estates had been in the hands of the big landowners. In Latvia approximately 57% of agricultural land was under  Baltic German ownership. The Baltic Germans bore the brunt of left-wing and nationalist agrarian reform (as in the new Czechoslovakia). The severity of the agrarian legislation introduced in Estonia on 10 October 1919 and in Latvia on 16 September 1920 reflected above all a determination to break the disproportionate political and economic power of the German element. In Estonia 96.6% of all the estates belonging to the Baltic Germans were taken over, together with farms and villas. The question of fair compensation was left open. In Latvia, in contrast to the implied promise in Estonia, nominal remainders usually made up of about 50 hectares and in a few cases 100 hectares, were left to the dispossessed estate owners, as well as an appropriate amount of stock and equipment. These concessions were seen by most Baltic Germans as offering little more than the life-style of a peasant farmer. Again, fair compensation was to be considered later. The Baltic Germans lost at a stroke most of their inherited wealth built up over 700 years.

Apart from the landed estate owners the rural Mittelstand dependent upon the old estates was severely affected. The expropriation of agrarian banks by the State also hit the Baltic Germans, who controlled/owned them. Paul Schiemann's later polemic against the Bank of Latvia came to the conclusion that 90% of Baltic Germans wealth had gone into the coffers of the Latvian State. Nothing could prevent the Estonian and Latvian political parties from pressing home the attack on Baltic German wealth. The USA Commissioner to the Baltic in 1919 wrote of the Estonians: "German Balts are their pet aversion, more so really than the Bolsheviks". His comment conveys the extreme position of the Baltic peoples on the subject of the Baltic Barons. The ruined and the dispossessed drifted to the cities and towns. The new left-wing government in Berlin was unsympathetic to their kin in the Baltic States and were bitterly attacked by Baron Wrangel, who from March 1919 had increasingly assumed the role of spokesman for the German Balts at the German Foreign Ministry (Auswartiges Amt) and argued that the internationally recognised  Treaty of Nystad guaranteed the position of the German minority in the Baltic.

The Baltic Barons and the Baltic Germans in general were given the new and lasting label of Auslandsdeutsch by the Auswärtiges Amt who now grudgingly entered into negotiations with the Baltic governments on their behalf, especially in relation to compensation for their ruination. Of the 84,000 German Balts twenty thousand or so emigrated to Germany during the course of 1920-21. More followed during the inter-war years.

The annexation of Estonia and Latvia by the Soviet Union took place in June 1940. Nowadays it is possible to find the successors of the Baltic nobility all around the world.

Manorial system
 Rural Estonia and Latvia was to a large extent dominated by a manorial estate system, established and sustained by the Baltic nobility, up until the declaration of independence of Latvia and Estonia following the upheavals after World War I. Broadly speaking, the system was built on a sharp division between the landowning, German-speaking nobility and the Estonian- or Latvian-speaking peasantry. Serfdom was for a long time a defining characteristic of the Baltic countryside and underscored a long-lasting feudal system, until its abolishment in the Governorate of Estonia in 1816, in the Courland Governorate in 1817 and in the Governorate of Livonia in 1819 (and in the rest of the Russian Empire in 1861). Still, the nobility continued to dominate the rural parts of Estonia and Latvia via manorial estates throughout the 19th century. However, almost immediately following the declaration of independence of Estonia and Latvia, both countries enacted far-reaching land reforms which in one stroke ended the former dominance of the Baltic nobility on the countryside.

The manorial system gave rise to a rich establishment of manorial estates all over present-day Estonia and Latvia, and numerous manor houses were built by the nobility. The manorial estates were agricultural centres and often incorporated, apart from the often architecturally and artistically accomplished main buildings, whole ranges of outbuildings, homes for peasants and other workers at the estates and early industrial complexes such as breweries. Parks, chapels and even burial grounds for the noble families were also frequently found on the grounds. Today these complexes form an important cultural and architectural heritage of Estonia and Latvia.

For an overview of manorial estates in Estonia and Latvia, see List of palaces and manor houses in Estonia and List of palaces and manor houses in Latvia.

Organization

They were organized in the Estonian Knighthood in Reval, Couronian Knighthood in Mitau, and Livonian Knighthood in Riga. Viborg also had an institution to register rolls of nobles in accordance with Baltic models in the 18th century.

Noble titles in Estonia, Livonia and Couronia
King: Magnus, King of Livonia, declared during the Livonian War
Duke: Dukes of Courland or Dukes of Schleswig-Holstein-Sonderburg-Beck, e.g. Peter August, Duke of Schleswig-Holstein-Sonderburg-Beck
Fürst (usually translated into English as Prince): e.g. Fürst Michael Andreas Barclay de Tolly or Prince Lieven
Count: e.g. Count Joseph Carl von Anrep
Baron (or the corresponding title of Freiherr): e.g. Baron Henrik Magnus von Buddenbrock; Baron Arthur SR.Friedrich Johann Ludwig von Kleist-Keyserlingk (1839-1915 Mitau, Latvia) "House Susten Gawesen"

Gallery

See also
History of Estonia
History of Latvia
Baltic Germans
Baltic knighthoods
Terra Mariana
Baltische Landeswehr

References

External links

Genealogisches Handbuch der baltischen Ritterschaften, family trees of Baltic nobility in German
Baltisches Wappenbuch, coats of arms of Baltic nobility
Estonian Manors Portal, the English version introduces 438 well preserved manors in Estonia, historically owned by the Baltic nobility

 
 
 
 
Nobility